Macavirus is a genus of viruses in the order Herpesvirales, in the family Herpesviridae, in the subfamily Gammaherpesvirinae. Mammals serve as natural hosts. There are nine species in this genus. Diseases associated with this genus include: inapparent infection in their reservoir hosts (wildebeest for alHV-1 and sheep for ovHV-2), but fatal lymphoproliferative disease when they infect MCF-susceptible hosts, including cattle, deer, bison, water buffalo and pigs.

Species 
The genus consists of the following nine species:

 Alcelaphine gammaherpesvirus 1
 Alcelaphine gammaherpesvirus 2
 Bovine gammaherpesvirus 6
 Caprine gammaherpesvirus 2
 Hippotragine gammaherpesvirus 1
 Ovine gammaherpesvirus 2
 Suid gammaherpesvirus 3
 Suid gammaherpesvirus 4
 Suid gammaherpesvirus 5

Structure 
Viruses in Macavirus are enveloped, with icosahedral, spherical to pleomorphic, and  Round geometries, and T=16 symmetry. The diameter is around 150-200 nm. Genomes are linear and non-segmented, around 180kb in length.

Life cycle 
Viral replication is nuclear, and is lysogenic. Entry into the host cell is achieved by attachment of the viral glycoproteins to host receptors, which mediates endocytosis. Replication follows the dsDNA bidirectional replication model. Dna templated transcription, with some alternative splicing mechanism is the method of transcription. The virus exits the host cell by nuclear egress, and  budding. Mammals serve as the natural host.

References

External links 

 Viralzone: Macavirus
 ICTV

Herpesviridae
Virus genera